Congregation Beth Tikvah Ahavat Shalom Nusach Hoari, also known simply as Beth Tikvah ('House of Hope'), is a Modern Orthodox synagogue in Dollard-des-Ormeaux, Quebec. The synagogue's Rabbi Dr. Mordecai Zeitz oversaw the building of its Hebrew Foundation School in the fall of 1970, also known as the "Hebrew Foundation School of Congregation Beth Tikvah", and served as its Educational Director.

History
Beth Tikvah was founded in 1964 by a group of about 20 young families who were considered pioneers of Jewish life in the West Island. Rabbi Mordecai Zeitz arrived at the invitation of local families, and with support from a synagogue-planting subsidy program of Yeshiva University. Beth Tikvah has run a supplementary school, Hebrew Academy, since the synagogue's establishment.

A house was purchased which accommodated the congregation and Hebrew school until the fall of 1968, when a congregation that would soon reach 300 families moved into a new multi-purpose auditorium on the present site.

Since 2004, the synagogue has housed an eighteenth-century torah scroll from Rokycany, Bohemia, originally secured by the Czech Memorial Scrolls Centre in 1964. In August 2007, Beth Tikvah merged with Congregation Ahavat Shalom Nusach Hoari, formed in 1910 (Nusach Hoari) and 1915 (Ahavat Shalom–Anshei Galicia).

School
In 1958, the United Synagogue Commission on Jewish Education had written that "congregations are urged to explore ... the possibility of establishing Hebrew Foundation Schools ...." Rabbi Dr. Mordecai Zeitz of the synagogue, who strongly supported Jewish education and had led they synagogue since 1964, oversaw the building of the school. The synagogue opened the elementary school, Hebrew Foundation School, in the fall of 1970, also known as the "Hebrew Foundation School of Congregation Beth Tikvah", with the synagogue's rabbi  as the school's Educational Director.

Notable Hebrew Foundation School alumni
Devon Levi (born 2001), ice hockey player

References

External links
 
 

1964 establishments in Quebec
Ashkenazi Jewish culture in Quebec
Ashkenazi synagogues
Dollard-des-Ormeaux
Jewish schools in Canada
Modern Orthodox synagogues in Canada
Jewish organizations established in 1964
Synagogues in Montreal